Ananda College, Devakottai, is a general degree college located in Devakottai, Tamil Nadu. It was established in the year 2004. The college is affiliated with Alagappa University. This college offers different courses in arts, commerce and science.

Departments

Science
Physics
Chemistry
Mathematics
Computer Science

Arts and Commerce
English
Business Administration
Commerce

Accreditation
The college is  recognized by the University Grants Commission (UGC).

References

External links

Educational institutions established in 2004
2004 establishments in Tamil Nadu
Colleges affiliated to Alagappa University